Alessio Ambrogetti (born 3 January 1989) is an Italian footballer who plays as a winger for Italian fourth division club Ravenna.

Career
Born in Forlimpopoli, the Province of Forlì–Cesena, Romagna, Ambrogetti started his career at Cesena. He was the member of Berretti U18 team and U20 reserve in 2006–07 season.

Ambrogetti made his debut in the last match of 2006–07 Serie B. He also played the last two rounds of 2007–08 Serie B.

After Cesena relegated at the end of season, Ambrogetti left for Valenzana. However, he was injured in pre-season and missed the first match. He was injured again in April.

Ambrogetti returned to Cesena on 1 July 2009. He was an overage player of the reserve team in 2009–10 season. In July 2010 Ambrogetti left for Calcio Como in co-ownership deal for a peppercorn fee of €500 

In June 2012 Cesena gave up the remain registration rights to Como for free. Ambrogetti then left for fourth division club Melfi. He was the eldest player of the team at age 22. It was only suppressed by mid-season signing of Giancarlo Improta and Daniele Greco. Ambrogetti scored 9 goals as team-topscorer, with Improta scored 6 times in half-season.

In July 2012 he was signed by Poggibonsi.

References

External links
 Football.it Profile 
 

1989 births
Living people
People from Forlimpopoli
Italian footballers
A.C. Cesena players
Valenzana Mado players
Como 1907 players
A.S. Melfi players
U.S. Poggibonsi players
Association football midfielders
Footballers from Emilia-Romagna
Sportspeople from the Province of Forlì-Cesena